Agostino Patrizi de Piccolomini (died 1495) was a Roman Catholic prelate who served as Bishop of Pienza (1484–1495) and Bishop of Montalcino (1484–1495).

Biography
Having been private secretary of Pope Pius II, on the latter's death on 14 August 1464, Patrizi entered the service of the pope's nephew, Cardinal Francesco Todeschini Piccolomini and in 1471, he accompanied the cardinal in that capacity on a journey to Germany to attend the Imperial Diet at Ratisbon. Patrizi also  served as a master of ceremonies in the papal chapel under Pope Paul II, resigning the post on 26 January 1484, subsequent to his appointment on 19 January as Bishop of Pienza and Bishop of Montalcino by Pope Sixtus IV.

On 14 March 1484, he was consecrated bishop by Constantin Eruli, Bishop of Spoleto, with Gabriele Maccafani, Bishop of Marsi, and Giovanni Battista Capranica, Bishop of Fermo, serving as co-consecrators.

While he was to hold the titles of Bishop of Pienza and Bishop of Montalcino until his death in 1495, or perhaps more probably on 3 July 1496, his real work was in Rome. He served as papal Master of Ceremonies from 1483, by appointment of  Pope Paul II and after a brief interruption in 1484–1485, he was reappointed by Pope Innocent VIII on 24 December 1485. Having published on 1 March 1488 the first systematic description of ceremonies connected with the papal court, the Sacrarum caeremoniarum sive rituum ecclesiasticorum Sanctae Romanae ecclesiae libri tres. he relinquished the post definitively in May that year.

References

Sources
Avesani, Rino (1964). "Per la Biblioteca di Agostino Patrizi Piccolomini, vescovo di Pienza." In" Mélanges Eugène Tisserant Vol. VI, part 1 (Città del Vaticano 1964), pp. 1–37. 

Mussari, Bruno (2008). "Palazzo Patrizi a Siena consistenza e ricognizione di un palazzo di fine '600 dai documenti d'acquisto ealcuni inventari." In:

External links

15th-century Italian Roman Catholic bishops
Bishops appointed by Pope Sixtus IV
1495 deaths